Alberto Colombo (November 27, 1888 – March 24, 1954) was an American film composer and music director.

He was nominated at the 10th Academy Awards in the category of Best Score for the film Portia on Trial.

He contributed to over 100 films.

Selected filmography

 Chatterbox (1936)
 The Wrong Road (1937)
 Portia on Trial (1937)
 Exiled to Shanghai (1937)
 Hi-Yo Silver (1940)
 Messenger of Peace (1947)
 Reaching from Heaven (1948)
 The Sickle or the Cross (1949)
 The Pilgrimage Play (1949)

References

External links

http://www.tcm.com/tcmdb/person/37347%7C9503/Alberto-Colombo/

American film score composers
American male film score composers
1888 births
1954 deaths
Musicians from New York City
Music directors
20th-century American male musicians